Ioannis Karamazakis (died 1978) was a Greek fencer. He competed in six events at the 1948 Summer Olympics.

References

External links
 

Year of birth missing
1978 deaths
Greek male fencers
Olympic fencers of Greece
Fencers at the 1948 Summer Olympics